The {{nihongo|I-351-class submarine|伊三百五十一型潜水艦|I-san-byaku-go-jū-ichi-gata sensuikan}} was a class of tanker/transport submarines built for the Imperial Japanese Navy (IJN) during World War II. The IJN called this type of submarine {{nihongo|Senho type submarine'''|潜補型潜水艦|Sen-Ho-gata sensuikan}}. The IJN designed these submarines to support flying boats in forward areas. By the time the first submarine was finished, this capability was no longer needed and she was converted into a tanker. That boat, was sunk on the return leg of her second voyage in 1945; the second boat, I-352, was destroyed by an American air raid before she was completed. Four additional submarines were planned, but were cancelled before they were laid down.

Design and description
The I-351-class submarines were ordered under the 5th Fleet Replenishment Program of 1942 to support IJN flying boats in areas where there were no shore facilities and seaplane tenders could not operate. They were designed to support up to three flying boats with fuel, ammunition, water and even replacement aircrew.

They displaced  on the surface and  submerged.

The boats had two propellers, each of which was driven by a  diesel engine as well as a  electric motor. This arrangement gave the I-351-class submarines a maximum speed of  while surfaced and  submerged. This gave them an endurance of 60 days.
[[File:Bridge of IJN submarine I-351 in 1945.jpg|thumb|I-351s conning tower, 1945]]
The boats were equipped with four  torpedo tubes in the bow and they carried four torpedoes. For surface combat they were designed to carry one  deck gun, but this was unavailable when the submarines were under construction and three  Type 3 mortars were substituted. The submarines were fitted with seven 25 mm Type 96 anti-aircraft guns, in two twin and three single mounts.

The I-351-class submarines were initially equipped to carry  of aviation gasoline,  of fresh water, and either sixty  bombs or 30 bombs and 15 aircraft torpedoes. Four of the torpedoes could be replaced by an equal number of reload torpedoes for the submarine.

Boats

Construction and service
Only I-351 and I-352 were actually laid down, the other four submarines were cancelled before their keels were laid.I-351 was modified before completion into an oil tanker. The boat made one round trip from Singapore, carrying  of aviation fuel, and was sunk on the return leg of her second trip in the South China Sea at coordinates  by the American submarine  on 14 July 1945. I-352'' was 90 percent complete when she was destroyed during an air raid by Boeing B-29 heavy bombers on 22 July.

Notes

Books

Further reading

Submarine classes
 
Submarines of the Imperial Japanese Navy